Arun Sharma may refer to:

Arun Sharma (Punjab cricketer) (born 1958), former Punjab cricket player, coach, selector and administrator
Arun Sharma (Services cricketer) (born 1971), former cricketer who played for J&K and Services, and coach
Arun Kumar Sharma (1924–2017), Indian cytogeneticist, cell biologist, and cytochemist
Arun Sarma, writer from Assam
Arun Sharma (computer scientist) (PdD 1990), Indian-Australian professor